Daniel Joseph Byrne (5 October 1885 – 9 June 1952) was an Irish politician, medical doctor and farmer. He was elected to Dáil Éireann at the 1922 general election as a Farmers' Party Teachta Dála (TD) for the Waterford–Tipperary East constituency. He did not contest the 1923 general election. 

He was born in Graiguealug, County Carlow, and was educated at Rockwell College, County Tipperary. He graduated from Yale School of Medicine in 1909. Following his return to Ireland in 1915 he later became involved in the Irish War of Independence.

References

Farmers' Party (Ireland) TDs
20th-century Irish farmers
Members of the 3rd Dáil
1885 births
1952 deaths
People educated at Rockwell College
Yale School of Medicine alumni